Miloš Čupić (born 24 April 1999) is a Serbian football goalkeeper who plays for Serbian side Inđija.

References

External links
 
 

1999 births
Sportspeople from Niš
Living people
Association football goalkeepers
Serbian footballers
OFK Beograd players
RFK Grafičar Beograd players
FK Zlatibor Čajetina players
Serbian First League players
Serbian SuperLiga players